Diego Francisco Rocha (born 7 June 1992), known as Dieguinho, is a Brazilian football player.

Club career
He made his professional debut in the Campeonato Brasileiro Série B for Paraná on 25 May 2011 in a game against Portuguesa.

On 31 January 2019, Dieguinho joined Belenenses SAD on a 3-year contract, starting from the 2019–20 season.

On 13 July 2021, he moved to Mafra.

References

External links

1992 births
Living people
People from Bebedouro
Brazilian footballers
Paraná Clube players
Campeonato Brasileiro Série B players
Avaí FC players
Campeonato Brasileiro Série A players
G.D. Estoril Praia players
Brazilian expatriate footballers
Expatriate footballers in Portugal
Primeira Liga players
S.C. Beira-Mar players
Liga Portugal 2 players
Portimonense S.C. players
C.D. Cova da Piedade players
Belenenses SAD players
C.D. Mafra players
Association football forwards
Footballers from São Paulo (state)